Wendy Bowman (born c.1934) is an Australian farmer and environmentalist in New South Wales. Thanks to her campaigning, she has been able to prevent the Chinese coal company Yancoal Australia developing coal mining in the Hunter Valley region. She has not only succeeded in keeping her family farm but has protected the local community from the effects of pollution and environmental degradation. In recognition of her efforts, in April 2017 she was one of six environmentalists (and the only woman) to be awarded the Goldman Environmental Prize.

Biography
Born in the 1930s in Sydney, Wendy Bowman belonged to a family which, on her father's side, arrived in Australia in 1798, and on her mother's side settled in the Hunter Valley in the 19th century. After graduating in art, she married the Hunter Valley farmer Mick Bowman. When he died in 1984, she took over the farm. She had to relocate in 1988 as a result of open mining operations.

In 1988, her crops failed when mining caused heavy metals to pollute the water which irrigated her field. As a result of coal dust in the grass, her cattle refused to eat. From 1990, first through MineWatch and later through the Hunter Environment Lobby, she assisted local farmers to take political action in New South Wales. After moving her farm once, in 2005 she was given six weeks to relocate in order to make way for another mine. She settled in Rosedale in Camberwell.

Bowman's Rosedale farm was itself threatened in 2010 when the Chinese Yancoal company planned an extension of the Ashton South East Open Cut mine to one of the main tributaries to the Hunter River. The majority of farmers in the area had sold their property by early 2015. Bowman, whose land covered more than half the coal in the proposed mine, refused to sell as she sought to protect the area from devastation. In December 2014, the Land and Environment Court ruled that Yancoal could only proceed with the mine if Bowman agreed to sell. Despite offers of millions of dollars, she continued to refuse, bringing Yancoal's efforts to a close.

In recognition of her efforts, in April 2017 she was awarded the Goldman Environmental Prize.

References

1930s births
Living people
Australian environmentalists
Australian women environmentalists
Australian farmers
Australian women farmers
People from the Hunter Region
People from Sydney
Goldman Environmental Prize awardees